Saleem Mukuddem (born 20 January 1972) is a former South African born Bermudian cricketer who played twenty One Day Internationals for the Bermuda national cricket team.

International career
He played in Bermuda's first ever One Day International, a match against Canada on 17 May 2006 taking two wickets. Three days later, Mukuddem scored 25 runs against Zimbabwe, although this was not enough, as Zimbabwe eventually won by 83 runs.

Mukuddem has played in all eight of Bermuda's ICC Intercontinental Cup games, the 2005 ICC Trophy, the ICC Americas Championship in 2004 and 2006 and the 2006 Stanford 20/20.

He announced his retirement from international cricket at the end of the 2007 Cricket World Cup.

Post retirement
In 2014, he was appointed interim chief executive officer of Eastern Province Cricket Board.

References

External links
 

1972 births
Living people
Bermudian cricketers
Bermuda One Day International cricketers